776 Berbericia is a minor planet orbiting the Sun. A main-belt C-type asteroid, it was discovered on 24 January 1914 by astronomer Adam Massinger at Heidelberg Observatory in southwest Germany. It was named by Max Wolf in honor of Adolf Berberich (1861–1920), a German astronomer. The spectra of the asteroid displays evidence of aqueous alteration.

Description 

In the late 1990s, a network of astronomers worldwide gathered lightcurve data that was ultimately used to derive the spin states and shape models of 10 new asteroids, including (776) Berbericia. The computed shape model for this asteroid is described as "asymmetric with sharp edges".

Richard P. Binzel and Schelte Bus further added to the knowledge about this asteroid in a lightwave survey published in 2003. This project was known as Small Main-belt Asteroid Spectroscopic Survey, Phase II  or SMASSII, which built on a previous survey of the main-belt asteroids. The visible-wavelength (0.435-0.925 micrometre) spectra data was gathered between August 1993 and March 1999.

References

External links 
 
 

000776
Discoveries by Adam Massinger
Named minor planets
000776
000776
19140124